Song Dae-kwan (born June 2, 1946) is a South Korean singer of Trot music. He often appears on the KBS 1TV 'Golden Oldies'.

Early life and education
Song was born in 1946 in what was then Jeonlla Province, now North Jeolla Province. His grandfather often ran afoul of the Japanese occupation authorities for his support of Korean independence. Song's father disappeared during the Korean War and has never been found. As such, he was raised by his mother, graduating from high school in Jeonju. In 1965, he moved to Seoul and became acquainted with Son Jin-seok, the president of Oasis Records, becoming a singer.

Career
Song released an album in 1971, though it was his 1975 album that helped propel him to stardom.

Discography

Albums 
 Song Dae Kwan (Works of Cho Dong San), September 2001
 Song Dae Kwan - Song & Life, September 2001
 Big Star Super Golden, May 2002

Collaborations 
 Song Dae Kwan Highlight Album - Sorry to Love You, February 2005 (with Koyote)

Ambassadorship 
 Jeonbuk's Honorary Ambassador (2022)

References

External links
 Song Dae Kwan in YesAsia
 Song Dae Kwan in empas people

1946 births
Living people
South Korean male singers
Trot singers
Yeosan Song clan